Dix Hill is the informal name for a high, rolling expanse of land and national historic district located at Raleigh, North Carolina. The district encompasses 18 contributing buildings, 1 contributing site, and 3 contributing structures. It includes notable examples of Colonial Revival, Bungalow / American Craftsman, and Stick Style / Eastlake movement architecture.  The Dorothea Dix Hospital, a historic institution caring for the mentally ill, was located on the site.  The hospital buildings were developed between about 1856 and 1940.

It was listed on the National Register of Historic Places in 1990.

Dix Hill is referred to in David Sedaris's novel Naked. It also appears in James Hurst's short story "The Scarlet Ibis" (first published July 1960 in The Atlantic Monthly).

References

External links

 National Register Historic Districts in Raleigh, North Carolina, RHDC
 Dix Hill Historic District, RHDC

Hospital buildings on the National Register of Historic Places in North Carolina
Historic districts on the National Register of Historic Places in North Carolina
National Register of Historic Places in Raleigh, North Carolina
Geography of Raleigh, North Carolina
American Craftsman architecture in North Carolina
Queen Anne architecture in North Carolina
Colonial Revival architecture in North Carolina